To Kwa Wan South is one of the 25 constituencies in the Kowloon City District of Hong Kong which was created in 1991.

The constituency has an estimated population of 15,646.

Councillors represented

1982 to 1985

1985 to 1991

1999 to present

Election results

2010s

Notes

References

To Kwa Wan
Constituencies of Hong Kong
Constituencies of Kowloon City District Council
1999 establishments in Hong Kong
Constituencies established in 1999
1982 establishments in Hong Kong
Constituencies established in 1982